Petrology is the branch of geology that studies rocks and the conditions under which they form. Petrology has three subdivisions: igneous, metamorphic, and sedimentary petrology. Igneous and metamorphic petrology are commonly taught together because they both contain heavy use of chemistry, chemical methods, and phase diagrams. Sedimentary petrology is, on the other hand, commonly taught together with stratigraphy because it deals with the processes that form sedimentary rock.

Background 
Lithology was once approximately synonymous with petrography, but in current usage, lithology focuses on macroscopic hand-sample or outcrop-scale description of rocks while petrography is the speciality that deals with microscopic details.

In the petroleum industry, lithology, or more specifically mud logging, is the graphic representation of geological formations being drilled through and drawn on a log called a mud log. As the cuttings are circulated out of the borehole, they are sampled, examined (typically under a 10× microscope) and tested chemically when needed.

Methodology

Petrology utilizes the fields of mineralogy, petrography, optical mineralogy, and chemical analysis to describe the composition and texture of rocks. Petrologists also include the principles of geochemistry and geophysics through the study of geochemical trends and cycles and the use of thermodynamic data and experiments in order to better understand the origins of rocks.

Branches 
There are three branches of petrology, corresponding to the three types of rocks: igneous, metamorphic, and sedimentary, and another dealing with experimental techniques:

Igneous petrology focuses on the composition and texture of igneous rocks (rocks such as granite or basalt which have crystallized from molten rock or magma). Igneous rocks include volcanic and plutonic rocks.
Sedimentary petrology focuses on the composition and texture of sedimentary rocks (rocks such as sandstone, shale, or limestone which consist of pieces or particles derived from other rocks or biological or chemical deposits, and are usually bound together in a matrix of finer material).
Metamorphic petrology focuses on the composition and texture of metamorphic rocks (rocks such as slate, marble, gneiss, or schist which started out as sedimentary or igneous rocks but which have undergone chemical, mineralogical or textural changes due to extremes of pressure, temperature or both)
Experimental petrology employs high-pressure, high-temperature apparatus to investigate the geochemistry and phase relations of natural or synthetic materials at elevated pressures and temperatures. Experiments are particularly useful for investigating rocks of the lower crust and upper mantle that rarely survive the journey to the surface in pristine condition. They are also one of the prime sources of information about completely inaccessible rocks such as those in the Earth's lower mantle and in the mantles of the other terrestrial planets and the Moon. The work of experimental petrologists has laid a foundation on which modern understanding of igneous and metamorphic processes has been built.

See also

 Important publications in petrology
 Ore
 Pedology

References

Citations

Sources 

 Best, Myron G. (2002), Igneous and Metamorphic Petrology (Blackwell Publishing) .
 Blatt, Harvey; Tracy, Robert J.; Owens, Brent (2005), Petrology: igneous, sedimentary, and metamorphic (W. H. Freeman) .
 
 Dietrich, Richard Vincent; Skinner, Brian J. (2009), Gems, Granites, and Gravels: knowing and using rocks and minerals (Cambridge University Press) 
 Fei, Yingwei; Bertka, Constance M.; Mysen, Bjorn O. (eds.) (1999), Mantle Petrology: field observations and high-pressure experimentation (Houston TX: Geochemical Society) .
 Philpotts, Anthony; Ague, Jay (2009), Principles of Igneous and Metamorphic Petrology (Cambridge University Press)  
 Robb, L. (2005). Introduction to Ore-Forming Processes (Blackwell Science)

External links

 Atlas of Igneous and metamorphic rocks, minerals, and textures – Geology Department, University of North Carolina
 Metamorphic Petrology Database (MetPetDB) – Department of Earth and Environmental Sciences, Rensselaer Polytechnic Institute
 Petrological Database of the Ocean Floor (PetDB) - Center for International Earth Science Information Network (CIESIN), Columbia University

 
Petroleum geology
Oilfield terminology